David Wiffen is the first studio album and second solo album by Canadian singer-songwriter David Wiffen. The standout tracks are "I've Got My Ticket", "Driving Wheel" and "More Often Than Not". As one reviewer recently commented, "Its complex arrangements sneak around behind seemingly simple songs which gives the whole thing an incredible depth. Stealing the show throughout is Wiffen's incredible baritone. It's smooth but fractured. It's the kind of voice you wish you had.  ...As you'll never own his talent, buy the record and get lost in the wonder and heartbreak..." "I've Got My Ticket" was inspired by Jerry Jeff Walker.

Track listing
All tracks composed by David Wiffen; except where indicated
"One Step"  (Kaye Lawrence Dunham) – 2:33
"Never Make a Dollar That Way" – 3:24
"I've Got My Ticket" – 2:45
"What a Lot of Woman" – 2:12
"Since I Fell for You"  (B.B. Johnson) – 3:28
"Driving Wheel" – 4:24
"Mr. Wiffen" – 2:50
"Blues Was the Name of the Song" – 1:34
"Mention My Name in Passing" – 2:20
"More Often Than Not" – 3:30

Personnel
David Wiffen – acoustic guitar, vocals, organ, arranger
Jerry Corbitt – electric guitar, acoustic guitar
Ed Bogas – piano, arranger
John McFee – steel guitar
Sandy Crawley – acoustic guitar
Kelly Bryan – bass guitar
Vic Smith – bass guitar
Bing Nathan – bass guitar
Greg Dewey – drums
Jeff Myer – drums
Jim Stern – drums
Jeremy Merrill – French horn
Germain Wallace – saxophone
Gerry Gilmore – saxophone
Bernard Krause – Moog synthesizer

Production
Producer: Ed Bogas
Recording Engineer: Robert DeSousa
Mixing: Robert DeSousa/Mike Fusaro
Photography: Tony Lane
Liner Notes: n/a

References 

David Wiffen albums
1971 albums
Fantasy Records albums
Albums produced by Ed Bogas